The Atlantic Association was a minor league baseball organization that operated between 1889 and 1890 and again in 1908 in the Northeastern United States.

History

First Demise
In each of the two seasons 4 or more teams failed to finish the season and with three teams remaining folded after the 1890 season. Only the New Haven Nutmegs survived after the demise of the league by transferring to another league.

Second Demise
A smaller league in 1908 was also like the first league and plagued by teams failing to finish the season. Despite being the best team, Portland folded with the demise of the league and disbanded with its association with the Maine State League.

Cities represented
Attleboro, Massachusetts: Attleboro Angels (1908) – team moved from Taunton
Baltimore, Maryland: Baltimore Orioles (1890) –  not to be mistaken for the Baltimore Orioles of the American Association
Easton, Pennsylvania: Easton (1889) –  unnamed club failed to complete season and folded in June 1889
Harrisburg, Pennsylvania: Harrisburg Athletics (1890) – former Harrisburg Ponies from the Pennsylvania State League and replaced the Jersey City Gladiators July 1890
Hartford, Connecticut: Hartford Baseball Club (1889); Hartford Nutmeggers (1890): team disbanded August 1890
Jersey City, New Jersey: Jersey City Skeeters (1889) Jersey City Gladiators (1890): replaced the Skeeters and then replaced by Harrisburg Athletics July 1890
Lebanon, Pennsylvania:  Lebanon (1890) – unnamed team disbanded August 25, 1890
Lewiston, Maine: Lewiston (1908)
Lowell, Massachusetts: Lowell (1889) –  unnamed team disbanded after 1889
New Haven, Connecticut: New Haven (1889) – unnamed team disbanded?; New Haven Nutmegs 1890: best team in the AA in 1892 but transferred to Eastern Association after end of season and last played as Eastern League's New Haven Bulldogs in 1932
Newark, New Jersey:  Newark Little Giants (1889–1890) – formerly with Eastern League, International League and Central League; club folded 1889
Newport, Rhode Island: Newport Ponies (1908) – disbanded May 19
Norwalk, Connecticut: Norwalk (1889) – unnamed team disbanded after single season
Pawtucket, Rhode Island:  Pawtucket Colts (1908) – originally with New England League in 1899
Portland, Maine: Portland Blue Sox (1908) –  best team in the AA in 1908, moved from Maine State League and appears to have joined New England League in 1919
Washington D.C.: Washington Senators (1890): disbanded July 1890
Wilkes-Barre, Pennsylvania: Wilkes-Barre Coal Barons (1889) –  disbanded August 1889
Wilmington, Delaware: Wilmington Peach Growers (1890) – disbanded August 1890
Taunton, Massachusetts: Taunton Angels (1908) – team moved to Attleboro, MA as Angels
Woonsocket, Rhode Island: Woonsocket Trotters (1908) – disbanded May 1908
Worcester, Pennsylvania: Worcester (1889–1890) – best team in the AA in 1889

Standings & statistics
1889 Atlantic Associationschedule 
 Norwalk disbanded September 2. Easton disbanded June 22.  Jersey City disbanded July 25.  Wilkes-Barre disbanded August 1.

 
1890 Atlantic Associationschedule
 Jersey City (27-46) disbanded July 22. Harrisburg, from the disbanded Interstate League, applied for the vacant franchise and joined the league July 24.  Worcester (37-31) moved to Lebanon July 28; Washington disbanded August 2; Hartford disbanded August 25; Wilmington disbanded August 27.  Baltimore left the league to join the American Association August 27.

1908 Atlantic Association
 Taunton moved to Attleboro; Woonsocket disbanded May 4; Pawtucket disbanded May 19. The league started May 2 and disbanded May 21.

Hall of Fame alumni
Jesse Burkett, 1889 Worcester 
Frank Grant, 1890 Harrisburg Athletics

See also

 Atlantic League (1896–1900)
 American Association (19th century)
 American Association (20th century)

References

Defunct minor baseball leagues in the United States
1889 establishments in the United States
1890 disestablishments in the United States
1908 establishments in the United States
1908 disestablishments in the United States
Baseball leagues in New Jersey
Baseball leagues in Connecticut
Baseball leagues in Maine
Baseball leagues in Maryland
Baseball leagues in Rhode Island
Baseball leagues in Delaware
Baseball leagues in Pennsylvania
Baseball leagues in Massachusetts